Iman Zandi (born 19 September 1981 in Fooladshahr, Iran) is a professional Iranian basketball player. He last played for the Zobahan Isfahan club of the Iranian Basketball Super League. He also played for the Iranian national basketball team.

External links
 profile

Living people
1981 births
Asian Games medalists in basketball
Asian Games bronze medalists for Iran
Basketball players at the 2006 Asian Games
Basketball players at the 2008 Summer Olympics
Iranian men's basketball players
Terrafirma Dyip players
Olympic basketball players of Iran
Philippine Basketball Association imports
Shooting guards
Medalists at the 2006 Asian Games
2010 FIBA World Championship players
Iranian expatriate basketball people in the Philippines
Sportspeople from Isfahan
Islamic Solidarity Games competitors for Iran